Murong Ping was a regent of the Xianbei-led Former Yan dynasty of China during the reign of Murong Wei (Emperor You), after the death of the previous, far more capable regent Murong Ke. He, along with Murong Wei's mother Empress Dowager Kezuhun, is often blamed for the Former Yan's decline and fall.

Early life
Murong Ping was one of the youngest, if not the youngest, sons of the Jin vassal, the Xianbei chief Murong Hui, the father of Former Yan's founder Murong Huang.  Although historical records do not give his age, it was probably close in range to Murong Jun, Murong Huang's heir apparent.  (This is corroborated in that his grandnephew Murong Wei, at one point, referred to him as an uncle rather than a granduncle, perhaps out of confusion in his young age.)  It is not known who his mother was.

The first reference to him in history was in 339, when he was mentioned as one of Murong Huang's generals (along with another brother, Murong Jun (note different tone and character than his nephew who would later inherit the throne), Muyu Gen, and Muyu Ni (慕輿泥)) who conducted a successful raid against Later Zhao's border region.

During Murong Jun's reign
In 348, Murong Huang died, and was succeeded by his son Murong Jun, who was then still using the Jin-created title Prince of Yan.  In 349, Later Zhao's emperor Shi Hu died, and his state soon fell into internecine wars between his sons and his adoptive grandson Shi Min.  Murong Jun therefore decided to advance south.  In Murong Jun's campaigns over the next few years, which saw him seize much of Later Zhao's territory and capture Shi Min (who had by then changed him name to Ran Min, to the family name that his father had before his adoption by Shi Hu) and destroy his short-lived state Ran Wei, Murong Ping served as a major general.  Murong Ping led the army that sieged Ran Wei's capital Yecheng (鄴城, in modern Handan, Hebei), after Ran Min's capture, in 352, against Ran Min's wife Empress Dong and son Ran Zhi, and the city fell to him, formally ending Ran Wei.  He was put in charge of Yecheng's defenses.  In 354, Murong Jun, who had by now completely broken from Jin and claimed imperial title, put him in charge of military operations in the Luoyang region (although Former Yan would not be able to capture Luoyang at this time) and also created him the Prince of Shangyong.  Over the next few years, Murong Ping would be involved in leading armies against various former Later Zhao generals who were still trying to maintain independence and vacillating between Former Yan, Former Qin, and Jin.  His campaigns were of mixed successes and failures.

In 360, Murong Jun grew seriously ill, and he commissioned his capable brother Murong Ke as regent for his son Murong Wei.  Murong Ping, Yang Wu, and Muyu Gen were to serve as Murong Ke's assistants.  Murong Jun soon died, and Murong Wei succeeded him.

During Murong Ke's regency
Muyu Gen, a more senior official than Murong Ke or Murong Ping, was unwilling to submit to Murong Ke, and he falsely told the young emperor and his mother Empress Dowager Kezuhun Murong Ke and Murong Ping were planning a rebellion.  Empress Dowager Kezuhun believed Muyu, but the young emperor did not and refused to authorize his actions.  Murong Ke soon found out and, after consulting with Murong Ping, executed Muyu and his clan.

Murong Ke was clearly the regent at this point, but he consulted Murong Ping on all major decisions.  His regency was considered a successful one, as he governed the empire with efficiency while expanding its borders southward, at Jin's expense.  Murong Ping's role in this success is unclear.  In 361, the magician Ding Jin (丁進), whom Murong Wei trusted, tried to flatter Murong Ke by suggesting to him to kill Murong Ping, but Murong Ke became angry and executed Ding.

In 366, both Murong Ke and Murong Ping offered to resign their posts and return all of their authorities to Murong Wei.  Murong Wei declined.

In 367, Murong Ke grew ill.  He tried to persuade Murong Ping, Murong Wei, and Murong Wei's older brother Murong Zang (慕容臧) the Prince of Le'an that one of his main responsibilities, as the commander of the armies, should be transferred to Murong Chui the Prince of Wu, his brother, as he saw Murong Chui as a capable general, but after Murong Ke died later that year, Murong Ping declined to do so, and instead gave that post to Murong Wei's younger brother Murong Chong the Prince of Zhongshan.  Murong Ping himself assumed the regency and held power in conjunction with Empress Dowager Kezuhun.

Regency
Murong Ping, while apparently having military abilities, was incompetent and corrupt as a regent.  In 368, when four of Former Qin's dukes rebelled against the Former Qin emperor Fu Jiān, they sought help from Former Yan.  Many officials, including Murong Jun's brother Murong De the Prince of Fanyang, saw this as a perfect opportunity to conquer Former Qin, but Murong Ping declined to take any actions against Former Qin, so Former Qin forces crushed the four rebel dukes.

In 368 as well, the key official Yue Wan, concerned about the growing corrupt practice by noble families of putting commoners into their fiefs—a practice that would mean that those commoners were only responsible to them, not responsible for paying taxes to the empire, leading to the empire's treasury being so lacking that it was unable to pay its officials—petitioned Murong Wei for a reform ending the practice.  Murong Wei approved the reform and put Yue in charge of it, and Yue restored over 200,000 people to the tax-paying ranks.  The nobles were all resentful of Yue, who died later in 368—and while most historians believed that he died of natural causes, having been already ill previously — the Book of Jin stated that he was poisoned by Murong Ping, who had much to lose from Yue's reform.

In 369, the Jin general Huan Wen launched a major attack against Former Yan, defeating every army that Murong Ping sent against him, including the most major one commanded by Murong Zang, advancing to the vicinity of Yecheng, by now Former Yan's capital.  In panic, Murong Ping and Murong Wei considered fleeing to the old capital Helong (和龍, in modern Jinzhou, Liaoning).  Murong Chui, whose authority had been curtailed by Murong Ping previously, offered to make one last try to resist.  Meanwhile, Murong Ping also sent messengers to Former Qin, requesting assistance—offering to cede to Former Qin the Luoyang region, which Murong Ke had captured in 365 if Former Qin would assist.  Murong Chui, along with Murong De, were able to deal Huan a major defeat, and Former Qin forces soon arrived and dealt Huan another defeat.  Huan would not be able to launch a major attack against Former Yan again.

However, Murong Ping and Empress Dowager Kezuhun soon engaged in two damaging decisions. Still resentful of Murong Chui (whose wife was her sister but whom he did not favor), Empress Dowager Kezuhun denied him and his soldiers rewards and in fact considered killing him, a decision that Murong Ping concurred in because he was also apprehensive of Murong Chui. Murong Chui, hearing the news, fled to Former Qin and became a general for Fu Jiān.  They also refused to cede the Luoyang region to Former Qin, as previously promised.  In anger, late in 369, Fu Jian sent a 60,000-men force, commanded by his prime minister Wang Meng, against Former Yan.

In spring 370, Wang first advanced on Luoyang and forced its surrender.  He then advanced on Hu Pass (壺關, in modern Changzhi, Shanxi), defeating all Former Yan resistance on the way.  He then captured Jinyang (晉陽, in modern Taiyuan, Shanxi).  Murong Ping led a 300,000-men strong force against Wang, but apprehensive of Wang, he stopped at Lu River (潞川, in modern Changzhi as well).  Wang soon arrived to prepare to face off against him.  Meanwhile, Murong Ping made the worst display of his corruption at this time—keeping guards at forests and streams, disallowing commoners and even his own soldiers from cutting firewood or fishing unless they paid a usage fee in either money or silk.  He soon had a stash of wealth, but completely lost the morale of his soldiers.  Murong Wei, hearing this, sent a messenger to rebuke him and ordering him to distribute the wealth to the soldiers, but the damage was done.  In winter 370, the armies engaged, and despite the numerical advantage that Murong Ping had, Wang crushed him, and Murong Ping fled back to Yecheng by himself.  Murong Wei abandoned Yecheng and tried to flee to Helong, but was captured on the way, ending Former Yan.  Murong Ping fled to Goguryeo, which, however, arrested him and delivered him back to Former Qin.  Fu Jiān pardoned him and made him an imperial assistant.  In 372, Murong Chui told Fu Jiān that Murong Ping was the cause of Former Yan's destruction and should be killed; instead Fu Jiān effectively exiled Murong Ping by making him a governor of a remote commandery.  This was the last historical record of him, and it is not known when or how he died.

When Murong Chui restored the regime as Later Yan, Murong Yi (慕容懿), grandson of Murong Ping, succeeded his title as Duke of Shangyong.

Former Yan regents
Former Yan imperial princes
Former Yan generals
Former Qin people
Sixteen Kingdoms chancellors
4th-century Chinese people